Toimii (Finnish "It works") is an ensemble for new music founded in the spring of 1980 by Finnish composer Magnus Lindberg with several other young composers and instrumentalists connected with the Sibelius Academy. Along with the new-music appreciation group Korvat auki (Finnish "Ears open"), it did much to bring new music to listeners in Finland in the 1980s and 1990s. 

Toimii was formed to be a laboratory where composers, instrumentalists and other artists could work on new ways of creating music and improvising. The idea of Toimii was born when Magnus Lindberg, Otto Romanowski, and Esa-Pekka Salonen were preparing a concert performance of Karlheinz Stockhausen's Plus-Minus.  Vinko Globokar and his improvisation group New Phonic Art had a significant influence on the burgeoning ensemble after Lindberg began studies with him in Paris in the autumn 1981, and it was at the Jyväskylä Summer Festival in 1982 where Lindberg's Action-Situation-Signification and a Globokar work were paired that the ensemble first appeared under the name Toimii. 

Apart from performing existing pieces and writing collective pieces Toimii encouraged poets, painters, dramaturgists and actors to write pieces for its concerts. Each rehearsal period started without a determined program and the rehearsals consisted of combining existing pieces with improvising and last minute composing and arranging. All of the members had an equal input into every detail of each concert.

Magnus Lindberg's 1985 masterpiece Kraft was written as a concerto for Toimii and a Symphony Orchestra, the ensemble has toured around the world performing the piece so far 14 times and has recorded it twice. Toimii visited many festivals in locations as far apart as Uusikaupunki, Tromsø and Ojai. 

Toimii has performed widely in Europe and in the US. While its members entered upon their own busy careers, they met once or twice each year during the 1980s and 1990s for a period of intensive work.  Toimii also performed several very successful children's concerts at the Suvisoitto-festival in Finland, at the Ojai Music Festival and at the Queen Elizabeth Hall in London, The last performances of the ensemble to date were in December 2001 at the Related Rocks Festival in London and in 2003 in Helsinki where they also made their second recording of Lindberg's Kraft.

Members
Lassi Erkkilä, percussion
Kari Kriikku, clarinet
Anssi Karttunen, cello
Timo Korhonen, guitar (joined 1989)
Juhani Liimatainen, sound designer
Magnus Lindberg, piano
Riku Niemi, percussion (joined 1989)
Otto Romanowski, electronics
Esa-Pekka Salonen, conductor

Works Written for Toimii
Juhana Blomstedt: Speleologia
Oliver Knussen: Rough Cut
Magnus Lindberg: Decorrente
Magnus Lindberg: Action-Situation-Signification for bass clarinet (doubling double bass clarinet), piano, percussion, cello, and live electronics (1982)
Magnus Lindberg: Kiri for clarinet, guitar, cello, percussion, and electronics (1993)
Magnus Lindberg: Kraft (1985)
Riku Niemi: Magnus meets Monk
Pentti Saaritsa: Ascensus
Esa-Pekka Salonen: Floof (1988)
Esa-Pekka Salonen: Nur-text
Juha Siltanen: Doppler Variation
Toimii-ensemble: Related Stones – A Rock Opera

Contemporary classical music ensembles
Musical groups established in 1980